Partida is a Spanish surname. Notable people with the surname include:

Ángel Partida (born 1989), Mexican footballer
José Partida (born 1989), Mexican footballer
José Luis Partida (born 1952), Mexican field hockey player
Kevin Partida (born 1995), American soccer player
Martha Partida Guzmán (born 1978), Mexican politician

Spanish-language surnames